Rhapsody is an operetta in 2 Acts by Fritz Kreisler (music) and John La Touche (lyrics) with a book by Arnold Sundgaard and Leonard Louis Levinson that is based on an original story by A. N. Nagler. The music from the operetta is taken mainly from Kreisler's 1932 Austrian-language operetta  and from his large collection of works for violin and piano; with only a relatively small portion of new music by Kreisler being added to the operetta's score. While La Touche was the primary lyricist, playwright Blevins Davis and American composer Robert Russell Bennett also contributed some lyrics. Additionally, Davis was the operetta's producer (along with the New York socialite Lorraine Manville Dresselhuys), and Bennett was the orchestrater of Kreisler's music which was originally scored for piano. The Austrian conductor Fritz Mahler served as the production's music director.

Opening at the New Century Theatre on Broadway on November 22, 1944, Rhapsody is set within the court of Roman Emperor Francis I and Empress Maria Theresa. The operetta was directed and choreographed by Russian-American ballet dancer David Lichine; who had achieved fame as a leading artist with The Royal Ballet in London and as a choreographer in Hollywood films. The production boasted highly expensive and elaborate sets designed by Tony Award winning designer Oliver Smith; with a production value of $300,000.00 Frank Bevan designed the production's costumes and Stanley McCandless served as lighting designer. While critics praised the music and the singing of the show's leads, reviews of the operetta's written dialogue were universally bad; and the show was widely mocked in the press as a result. The play closed on December 2, 1944, after just 14 performances which proceeded 8 additional performances given in previews; making it one of the most expensive flops on Broadway at the time that it closed.

Roles

References

External links

1944 musicals
1944 operas
Operas
Broadway theatre
Original musicals
English-language operettas
Compositions by Fritz Kreisler